The Tanganyika national cricket team toured Kenya in December 1951 and played one three-day match against the Kenyan team. It was the first ever match between the two teams. It was the first of a series of occasional matches against countries in east Africa which would eventually lead to a formal triangular tournament being introduced in 1967.

Only match

References

1951 in Kenyan cricket